Manolis Angelopoulos (8 April 1939 – 2 April 1989) was a Greek singer of Gypsy origin.

Biography 
During his childhood Angelopoulos traveled all over Greece with his Hellenized-Gypsy family caravan selling a variety of goods from carpets to watermelons. The caravan trucks had a microphone and he began to sell these items through the use of his singing voice over the loudspeakers. After losing his father when he was 13, he tried to help his family by working in several clubs. His singing talent attracted many composers and producers offering him the opportunity to record his first song in 1957.

He gained popularity during the 1960s through his love songs as well as songs about Greek refugees and exotic places. He also brought a mix of Greek-Gypsy-Arabian influences into his songs. His song Ta Mavra Matia Sou is considered one of his most popular songs. The melody is based on a tune by the Egyptian composer Mohammed Abdel Wahab.

Manolis Angelopoulos died in London hospital on 2 April 1989, one week before his fifty years, due to complications from heart surgery (triple bypass), which he had submitted on 14 January. He is one of the most celebrated singers in Greece.

He married a native Greek woman, Anna Vasileiou, who was also a singer. They had three children; Elias, Stathis, and Maria, whose godfather was Stelios Kazantzidis.

Famous songs
"Τα μαύρα μάτια σου" (Ta mavra matia sou)
"Τη βαρεθηκε η ψυχη μου" (Ti varethike i psichi mou)
"Σβήσε με κυρά μου" (Svise me kyra mou)
"Τα φιλιά σου είναι φωτιά" (Ta filia sou enai fotia)

References

1939 births
1990 deaths
Greek laïko singers
20th-century Greek male singers
Greek Romani people
Romani singers
Greek people of Romani descent
Singers from Athens